Aïda Fall (born 10 November 1986) is a French-Senegalese basketball player for Hainaut.

References

External links
 
 
 
 

French sportspeople of Senegalese descent
French women's basketball players
Citizens of Senegal through descent
Senegalese women's basketball players
Basketball players at the 2016 Summer Olympics
Olympic basketball players of Senegal
1986 births
Living people
African Games gold medalists for Senegal
African Games medalists in basketball
Senegalese expatriate basketball people in France
Competitors at the 2011 All-Africa Games
Centers (basketball)